Lutheran High School North may refer to:

Lutheran High School North (Michigan), Macomb Township, Michigan
Lutheran High School North (Missouri), St. Louis, Missouri
Lutheran High School North (Texas), Houston, Texas